The 2020 FIL Junior European Luge Championships took place under the auspices of the International Luge Federation at the Winterberg bobsleigh, luge, and skeleton track, Winterberg, Germany on 31 January 2020.

Schedule
Four events were held.

Medal summary

Medal table

Medalists

References

FIL Junior European Luge Championships
European Junior Championships
FIL Junior European Luge Championships
Sports competitions in North Rhine-Westphalia
International luge competitions hosted by Germany